Janet Opal Asimov (née Jeppson; August 6, 1926 – February 25, 2019), usually written as J. O. Jeppson, was an American science fiction writer, psychiatrist, and psychoanalyst.

She started writing children's science fiction in the 1970s. She was married to Isaac Asimov from 1973 until his death in 1992, and they collaborated on a number of science fiction books aimed at young readers, including the Norby series. She died in February 2019 at the age of 92.

Education and career
Jeppson earned a B.A. degree from Stanford University (first attending Wellesley College), her M.D. degree from New York University Medical School, completing a residency in psychiatry at Bellevue Hospital. In 1960, she graduated from the William Alanson White Institute of Psychoanalysis, where she continued to work until 1986. After her marriage to Isaac Asimov, she continued to practice psychiatry and psychoanalysis under the name Janet O. Jeppson, and she published medical papers under that name.

Writing 
Janet Asimov's first published writing was a "mystery short" sold to Hans Stefan Santesson for The Saint Mystery Magazine, which appeared in the May 1966 issue. Her first novel was The Second Experiment in 1974; Asimov wrote mostly science fiction novels for children throughout her career. As a psychiatrist she incorporated aspects of psychoanalysis, human identity, and other psychiatry-related ideas in her writing. According to Isaac Asimov, the books that Janet Asimov wrote in association with him were 90 percent Janet's, and his name was wanted on the books by the publisher "for the betterment of sales". After Isaac's death, she took on the writing of his syndicated popular-science column in the Los Angeles Times.

Husband 
Janet Jeppson began dating Isaac Asimov in 1970 immediately following his separation from Gertrude Blugerman. They were married on November 30, 1973, two weeks after Asimov's divorce from Gertrude. Despite Jeppson's upbringing in the Church of Jesus Christ of Latter-day Saints, their marriage was officiated by a leader of Ethical Culture, a humanist religious group that Janet later joined. On the same day, she learned that her first novel, The Second Experiment, would be published (under her maiden name).

Their marriage lasted until Isaac's death in 1992 from complications relating to HIV, contracted from a 1983 blood transfusion during bypass surgery. Janet reportedly consulted medical texts after Isaac began exhibiting symptoms, and she requested an HIV test be performed. His doctors insisted she was wrong and only tested Isaac for the infection after he became seriously ill. She wanted the information made public, but doctors insisted upon not disclosing it, even after Isaac died. After the doctors advising silence had all died, Janet Asimov went public with the knowledge.

Bibliography

Novels
The Second Experiment (1974) (as J. O. Jeppson)
The Last Immortal (1980) (a sequel to The Second Experiment) (as J. O. Jeppson)
Mind Transfer (1988)
The Package in Hyperspace (1988)
Murder at the Galactic Writers' Society (1994)
The House Where Isadora Danced (2009) (as J. O. Jeppson)

Norby Chronicles (with Isaac Asimov)
Norby, the Mixed-Up Robot (1983)
Norby's Other Secret (1984)
Norby and the Lost Princess (1985)
Norby and the Invaders (1985)
Norby and the Queen's Necklace (1986)
Norby  Finds a Villain (1987)
Norby Down to Earth (1988)
Norby and Yobo's Great Adventure (1989)
Norby and the Oldest Dragon (1990)
Norby and the Court Jester (1991)
Norby and the Terrified Taxi (1997) Written alone, after her husband's death.

Collections
The Mysterious Cure, and Other Stories of Pshrinks Anonymous (1985) (as J. O. Jeppson hardcover, as Janet Asimov paperback)
 The Touch: Epidemic of the Millennium. Edited by Patrick Merla. . (Janet Asimov contributor)

Anthologies
Laughing Space: Funny Science Fiction Chuckled Over (1982) with Isaac Asimov

Nonfiction
How to Enjoy Writing: A Book of Aid and Comfort (1987) with Isaac Asimov
Frontiers II (1993) with Isaac Asimov
It's Been a Good Life (2002) edited, with Isaac Asimov
Notes for a Memoir: On Isaac Asimov, Life, and Writing (as Janet Jeppson Asimov) (New York: Prometheus Books, 2006);

References

External links

Obituary at The Humanist website, 4 March 2019
Obituary at Locus Online, 5 March 2019

1926 births
2019 deaths
20th-century American novelists
21st-century American novelists
American science fiction writers
American women short story writers
American short story writers
American women novelists
Novelists from Pennsylvania
People from Ashland, Pennsylvania
New York University Grossman School of Medicine alumni
Stanford University alumni
American women psychiatrists
American psychoanalysts
Women science fiction and fantasy writers
20th-century American women writers
21st-century American women writers
Wellesley College alumni
Ethical movement
Former Latter Day Saints
Bellevue Hospital physicians